Thompson Square is a  park in Boston's Charlestown neighborhood, in the U.S. state of Massachusetts.

References 

Charlestown, Boston
Parks in Boston